Andreas Lie (born 31 August 1987, in Ålesund) is a Norwegian association footballer who currently plays as a goalkeeper for Aalesund.

Career

Aalesund
Lie started his senior career with Aalesund in 2004. In his five year spell there, he made 33 league appearances.

Hødd (First Loan)
For the 2005 season, Lie was loaned out to Hødd. He made 6 appearances in the league before his loan spell expired.

ODDS
In January 2010, Lie was sold to Odds BK. However, he only made nine league appearances in two years with the club.

Return to Aalesund
On 14 August 2012 he announced that he was leaving Odd Grenland as his contract expired at the end of the 2012 season and broke the news that he had re-signed for Aalesund on a two-year contract, starting 1 January 2013 and lasting until the end of the 2014 season.

Hødd (Second Loan)
In January 2013, Lie was loaned out again to Hødd. This time, he made 25 league appearances, helping them to the promotion playoffs.

International
Lie has played 15 matches for the Norwegian under-21 national team.

Personal life
Lie's twin brother, Oddbjørn Lie, also plays for Aalesund.

Career Statistics

References

External links
 
 Andreas Lie at Aalesunds FK 
 
 

1987 births
Living people
Sportspeople from Ålesund
Norwegian footballers
Aalesunds FK players
IL Hødd players
Odds BK players
Eliteserien players
Association football goalkeepers